Randaberg is the administrative centre of Randaberg municipality in Rogaland county, Norway. The European route E39 highway passes just outside of Randaberg to the east. The village is the site of the municipal administration for Randaberg municipality as well as the site of Randaberg Church.

Randaberg Stadion, the main stadium for the Randaberg IL sports club is located in Randaberg village.

References

Villages in Rogaland
Randaberg